Joanna Sulej (born 16 September 1989 in Łosice) is a Polish figure skater who competed as both a single skater and pair skater.

As a single skater, she was the 2005 and 2006 Polish junior national champion. She teamed up with Mateusz Chruściński to compete in pairs in 2008 and they began competing together in the 2008-2009 season. They represented Poland at the 2010 Winter Olympics.

Programs

Pairs career

Competitive highlights

Pairs career
(with Chruściński)

Singles career

References

 
 Joanna Sulej & Mateusz Chruściński at the Polish Figure Skating Association
 Joanna Sulej at the Polish Figure Skating Association
 Joanna Sulej & Mateusz Chruściński at the UKŁF "Unia" Oświęcim
 Joanna Sulej at the RKS Marymont Warszawa club homepage
Joanna Sulej & Mateusz Chruściński at the Planète Patinage
Joanna Sulej at the Tracings.net
 Joanna Sulej at the Figure Skating Online

1989 births
Living people
People from Łosice County
Polish female pair skaters
Polish female single skaters
Figure skaters at the 2010 Winter Olympics
Olympic figure skaters of Poland
Sportspeople from Masovian Voivodeship